Nuraita or Nhuraita (spelling variations: Nuraitha, Nhuraitha) is a Mandaean female given name that may refer to a few different figures in the Ginza Rabba and other Mandaean texts:

Nuraita, Noah's wife
Nuraita, Dinanukht's wife